Nusi Somogyi (Born Anna Irén Somogyi; March 3, 1884 – October 8, 1963) was a Hungarian film and stage actress.

Selected filmography
 Harrison and Barrison (1917)
 Mary Ann (1918)
 White Rose (1919)
 Neither at Home or Abroad (1919)
 Cafe Moscow (1936)
 Orient Express (1943)
 Two Confessions (1957)
 St. Peter's Umbrella (1958)
 Kálvária (1960)

Pictures

Bibliography
 Kulik, Karol. Alexander Korda: The Man Who Could Work Miracles. Virgin Books, 1990.

External links

1884 births
1963 deaths
Hungarian film actresses
Hungarian silent film actresses
20th-century Hungarian actresses
Hungarian stage actresses
Actresses from Budapest